The House of Mirth is a 1905 novel by American author Edith Wharton. It tells the story of Lily Bart, a well-born but impoverished woman belonging to New York City's high society around the end of the 19th century. Wharton creates a portrait of a stunning beauty who, though raised and educated to marry well both socially and economically, is reaching her 29th year, an age when her youthful blush is drawing to a close and her marital prospects are becoming ever more limited. The House of Mirth traces Lily's slow two-year social descent from privilege to a tragically lonely existence on the margins of society. In the words of one scholar, Wharton uses Lily as an attack on  "an irresponsible, grasping and morally corrupt upper class."

Before publication as a book on October 14, 1905, The House of Mirth was serialized in Scribner's Magazine beginning in January 1905. It attracted a readership among women and men alike. Charles Scribner wrote Wharton in November 1905 that the novel was showing "the most rapid sale of any book ever published by Scribner." By the end of December, sales had reached 140,000 copies. Wharton's royalties were valued at more than half a million dollars in today's currency. The commercial and critical success of The House of Mirth solidified Wharton's reputation as a major novelist.

Because of the novel's commercial success, some critics classified it as a genre novel. However, Wharton's pastor, then rector of Trinity Church in Manhattan, wrote to tell her that her novel was "a terrible but just arraignment of the social misconduct which begins in folly and ends in moral and spiritual death." This moral purpose was not lost on the literary reviewers and critics of the time, who tended to categorize it as both social satire and a novel of manners. When describing it in her introduction to Edith Wharton's The House of Mirth: A Case Book, Carol Singley states that the novel "is a unique blend of romance, realism, and naturalism, [and thus] transcends the narrow classification of a novel of manners."
The House of Mirth was Wharton's second published novel, preceded by two novellas, The Touchstone (1900) and Sanctuary (1903), and a novel, The Valley of Decision (1902).

Background, theme, and purpose

Wharton considered several titles for the novel about Lily Bart;  two were germane to her purpose:

A Moment's Ornament appears in the first stanza of William Wordsworth's (1770–1850) poem, "She was a Phantom of Delight" (1804) that describes an ideal of feminine beauty: 
 

"A moment's ornament" represents the way Wharton describes Lily's relationship to her reference group as a beautiful and well-bred socialite. Her value lasts only as long as her beauty and good-standing with the group is maintained. By centering the story around a portrait of Lily, Wharton was able to address directly the social limitations imposed upon her. These included the mores of the upper crust social class to which Lily belonged by birth, education, and breeding.

The final title Wharton chose for the novel was The House of Mirth (1905), taken from the Old Testament:

The House of Mirth spotlights social context as equally important to the development of the story's purpose, as the heroine. "Mirth" contrasted with "mourning" also bespeaks a moral purpose as it underscores the frivolity of a social set that not only worships money, but also uses it ostentatiously solely for its own amusement and aggrandizement. At the time the novel takes place, Old New York high society was peopled by the extraordinarily wealthy who were conditioned by the economic and social changes the Gilded Age (1870–1900) wrought. Wharton's birth around the time of the Civil War predates that period by a little less than a decade. As a member of the privileged Old New York society, she was eminently qualified to describe it authentically. She also had license to criticize the ways New York high society of the 1890s had changed without being vulnerable to accusations of envy motivated by coming from a lower social caste. She accused her peers of having lost the sense of noblesse oblige of their forebears.

Wharton revealed in her introduction to the 1936 reprint of The House of Mirth her choice of subject and her major theme:

Wharton figured that no one had written about New York society because it offered nothing worth writing about. But that did not deter her as she thought something of value could be mined there. If only the writer could dig deeply enough below the surface, some "'stuff o' the conscience'" could be found. She went on to declare unabashedly that:

The central theme of The House of Mirth is essentially the struggle between who we are and what society tells us we should be.  Thus, it is considered by many to be as relevant today as it was in 1905. If its sole subject had been the excesses and lives of the rich and famous, by themselves, it is doubtful it would have remained popular for as long as it has. The House of Mirth continues to attract readers over a century after its first publication, possibly due to its timeless theme. That the life and death of Lily Bart matters to modern readers suggests that Wharton succeeded in her purpose: to critique "a society so relentlessly materialistic and self-serving that it casually destroys what is most beautiful and blameless within it."

Plot

Lily Bart, a beautiful but impoverished socialite, is on her way to a house party at Bellomont, the country home of her best friend, Judy Trenor. Her pressing task is to find a husband with the requisite wealth and status to maintain her place in New York society.  Additional challenges to her success are her advancing age—at twenty-nine, she has been on the "marriage market" for more than ten years—her penchant for gambling at bridge that has left her with debts beyond her means to pay, and her efforts as part of upper-crust society to keep up appearances with her wealthy friends. Lily's choices are further complicated by her innermost desire to marry for love as well as money and status, and her longing to be free of the claustrophobic constrictions and routines of upper-crust society.

Judy has arranged for her to spend more time in the company of Percy Gryce, a potential suitor who is wealthy but whom Lily finds boring. Lily grew up surrounded by elegance and luxury—an atmosphere she believes she cannot live without, as she has learned to abhor "dinginess." The loss of her father's wealth and the death of her parents left her an orphan at twenty. Lacking an inheritance or a caring protector, she adapts to life as a ward of her strait-laced aunt Julia Peniston from whom she receives an erratic allowance, a fashionable address, and good food, but little direction or parenting. Lily is not fond of her aunt Julia and avoids her whenever possible while simultaneously relying on her for both necessities and luxuries.

In the opening sentence of the House of Mirth Edith Wharton places Lily in "Grand Central Station" where Lawrence Selden, a friend and possible love interest, is taken by surprise to see her. Threats to Lily's reputation exist because of her tendency to push the limits of polite and acceptable behavior. On the way to visit Bellomont, she impulsively accompanies Selden during her two-hour wait for the change of trains to his Manhattan flat in the Benedick Building. On leaving the building, she encounters Mr. Rosedale, a Jewish businessman known to her set and the owner of the building. Attempting to cover the appearance of an indiscretion, she worsens the situation by telling Rosedale she had  been consulting her dress-maker. This obvious lie is the first of a series of faux pas Lily gets caught up in. As
she makes an effort to explain away the social chances she takes, she becomes easy prey for her enemies to misrepresent her intention and behavior.

Near the week's end, the tall, handsome and engaging Selden unexpectedly shows up at Bellomont. Having already failed to meet Percy for morning church services, and fully aware that Lawrence has just ended an illicit relationship with the married but vindictive Bertha Dorset, Lily chooses to go for a long walk with Lawrence and to spend the afternoon with him instead of with Percy or the rest of the party. Even though Lily has already made it clear to Selden during their tête-à-tête in his flat that she looked at him as that friend who won't be afraid to say disagreeable things to her, she becomes drawn to him romantically. Succumbing to her agreeable femininity, Selden is in love with Lily. He feels foolish in nurturing an emotional attachment to her because she clearly states that she cannot and will not marry a man of his modest means. Fresh out of his four-year affair with Bertha Dorset, Lawrence begins to slide into another emotional attachment with the equally unavailable Lily.

Lily's week at Bellomont ends up in a series of failures beginning with losing a large sum at bridge. She fails to become engaged to Percy Gryce despite his initial interest in her. Although she has presented herself as a conservative, innocent person so as to snare a conservative husband, her actions with Selden reveal her pretense. She exaggerates the extent of her relationship with Percy until everyone at Bellomont thinks an engagement between them is imminent. Bertha still has feelings for Lawrence notwithstanding her recent breakup with him. As she notices Selden's fondness for Lily, she decides to sabotage Lily's budding romance with Percy by filling him in on the most salacious and scandalous rumors about Lily's card-playing and past romantic life. This effectively frightens Percy away. Lily manages to cast the blame on Judy for having been the one to set the match up.

On her last day at Bellomont, Lily creates threats to her social standing. Gus Trenor, a very skilled stockbroker, is married to Lily's best friend Judy. Judy is not particularly jealous of Gus's occasional conversations or flirtations with other women, unless he becomes so emotionally attached to them as to spend money on them or to give them money, which Judy rightly recognizes as a sign that the relationship has become a threat to their marriage. Lily is fully aware of Judy's jealousy on the money issue, and she is aware that Judy does not approve when other women, such as the financially embarrassed Carry Fisher, persuade Gus to speculate on their behalf in the stock market. Yet Lily persuades Gus to do just that. Lacking the financial knowledge to understand the difference between a legitimate loan or speculation, Lily flirts with Gus and allows him to hold her hand and lean against her. She convinces herself that Gus is making investments on her behalf and accepts several large checks from him. On several occasions, however, Gus makes it clear that he expects romantic attention from Lily in exchange for his financial expertise. Instead of discussing the issue openly, Lily begins to play cat and mouse with him. To avoid being with him in private, she appears in public with him at the opera and for late afternoon walks in Central Park with him. This attracts other people's attention.

Gradually, Lily begins to suffer the consequences of her indiscreet behavior. Percy, having been scared away by Lily's behavior and Bertha Dorset's malicious gossip, proposes to a young woman named Evie Van Osburgh, who is much better suited to him than Lily and who was introduced to him by Bertha Dorset herself. Mrs. Dorset's public pride in her match-making victory results in social ridicule for Lily from the people whom she directly and indirectly misled into thinking she and Percy were all but engaged. Finally, in retribution for a social snub, Lily's cousin Grace Stepney informs their aunt Julia about rumors that Lily has gambling debts which she may be trying to cover through an inappropriate relationship with Gus Trenor.  This sows seeds of doubt and discomfort in Aunt Julia who, though shocked, does not discuss the situation with her niece so as to avoid a scene. Furthermore, Lily has destroyed her relationship with Gus and Judy Trenor. Judy's attitude toward Lily has cooled, partly due to Lily's financial relationship with Gus and partly because Lily now avoids Bellomont because she does not wish to hold up her end on what everybody else believes to be a pay-for-play relationship.

To avoid having to spend time alone with her aunt, the Trenors, Simon Rosedale, or anyone else she considers a possible source of embarrassment or boredom, Lily begins to accept invitations from people with whom she would not ordinarily socialize. These include the Wellington Brys, who are newcomers to the New York social scene, and whose social rise is being engineered by Carry Fisher. Carry, who earns money by acting as a social secretary to usher newly wealthy people into fashionable society, invites Lily to social events hosted by Louisa Bry. Lily also attends the opera with Carry, Simon Rosedale, and Gus Trenor. In the eyes of high society, Lily cheapens herself by voluntarily associating with her social inferiors. She returns briefly to Bellomont only to find that she is now being teased by her social peers for socializing with the upstart Brys and with Simon Rosedale.

Lily is not entirely without resources for social rehabilitation or at least blackmail. One of her aunt's temporary servants, who is also the charwoman at Selden's apartment, sells Lily a package of torn love letters. These were written by Bertha Dorset, and they represent an opportunity for Lily to blackmail her enemy. But instead of blackmailing Bertha into a positive relationship, Lily tries to neutralize the gossip by making herself useful to Bertha. Bertha, who has a new love interest in the form of a young man named Ned Silverton, relies on Lily to distract her husband George Dorset.
 
The extent to which Lily's reputation is damaged becomes obvious when Lily publicly appears in a way that comes across as advertising her availability for an illicit relationship. Following Mrs. Fisher's advice, the Wellington Brys throw a large "general entertainment" featuring a series of tableaux vivants portrayed by a dozen fashionable women in their set, including Miss Bart.

The pièce de résistance of this highly successful event turned out to be the portrayal of Mrs. Lloyd in Sir Joshua Reynolds' famous 18th-century painting (1775–1776). The portrait shows an attractive woman suggestively clad. As the curtain opens on this last scene, the gasp of approval heard from the audience was not so much for Reynolds’ brilliant interpretation of Mrs. Lloyd as it was for the loveliness of Lily Bart herself—marking the pinnacle of her social success but also the annihilation of whatever reputation is left to her. For better or for worse, she has transitioned from a marriageable "girl" to a not-quite-reputable woman similar to Carry Fisher. Yet she does not do as Carry Fisher does, and accept the loss of her respectability as the price she must pay to maintain a position in society.

As Selden observes her in this elegantly simple tableau, he sees the real Lily Bart as if for the first time and feels the desire to be with her. He finds her alone in the ballroom toward the end of the musical interlude, as the collective praise from her admirers is subsiding. He leads her to a garden where he tells her he loves her and they kiss. Lily sighs, " 'Ah, love me, love me—but don't tell me so!' " and takes her leave.  As Selden gathers his coat to leave, he is disturbed by Ned Van Alstyne's remarks, ". . . .Gad, what a show of good-looking women; but not one of 'em could touch that little cousin of mine. . . . I never knew till tonight what an outline Lily has."

The next day, Lily receives two notes—one from Judy Trenor inviting her to dine that evening at her town house and the other from Selden—asking to meet with her the following day. Though she had a dinner engagement, she agreed to a visit with Judy at ten o'clock. However, her late-evening encounter turns out to be with Gus alone. Gus vehemently demands the kind of attention he thought he had paid for. Pleading naïveté about business matters and appealing to their friendship, she promises to pay back the almost $10,000 she owes him. With heightened anger and resentment, he accuses Lily of playing with him while entertaining other men. Lily gets him to back off and flees, getting into a hansom cab. Shaken and feeling very much alone, she is unaware that she has been seen by both Ned Van Alstyne and Lawrence Selden, both of whom were aware that Judy was out of town and that the Trenor house in New York is occupied by Gus alone. The unspoken conclusion, shared between the two men, is that the rumors of Lily's romantic involvement with Gus Trenor have a solid basis in fact. Ned, as a relative of the family, asks Lawrence to not tell anybody what they saw. But the damage is done. Lily calls on her friend Gerty Farish for succor and shelter for the rest of the night, and returns to her aunt in the morning.

The following day Lily pleads with her aunt to help her with her debts and confesses that she has lost money gambling at bridge even on Sundays. Aunt Julia refuses to help her, except to cover the $1,000 to $2,000 bill for clothes and accessories. Feeling trapped and disgraced, she turns to thoughts of Selden as her savior and has a change of heart towards him as she looks forward to his visit at four o'clock.

Instead, her visitor turns out to be Simon Rosedale who, so smitten by her appearance in the tableau vivant, proposes a marriage that would be mutually beneficial. Considering what Rosedale knows about her, she skillfully pleads for time to consider his offer    Selden does not appear for his 4:00 appointment nor does he send word in explanation. Instead he has departed for Havana and then on to Europe on business. This comes as a shock to Lily.

To escape the rumors arising from the gossip caused by her financial dealings with Gus Trenor, and also disappointed by what she interprets as Selden's emotional withdrawal, Lily accepts Bertha Dorset's spur-of-the- moment invitation to join her and George on a Mediterranean cruise aboard their yacht, the Sabrina. Bertha intends for Lily to keep George distracted while Bertha carries on an affair with young Ned Silverton. Lily's decision to join the Dorsets on this cruise proves to be her social undoing.

In order to divert the attention and suspicion of their social circle away from her, Bertha insinuates that Lily is carrying on a romantic and sexual liaison with George by commanding that she not return to the yacht in front of their friends at the close of a dinner the Brys held for the Duchess in Monte Carlo. Selden helps by arranging a night's lodging with her cousin Jack Stepney, under the promise that she leave promptly in the morning. The ensuing social scandal ruins Lily's reputation and almost immediately causes her friends to abandon her and Aunt Julia to disinherit her.

Undeterred by such misfortunes, Lily fights to regain her place in high society by befriending Mr. and Mrs. Gormer and becoming their social secretary, so as to introduce the Gormers to high society and groom them to take a better social position. However, her enemy, the malicious Bertha Dorset, gradually communicates to them the "scandalous" personal background of Lily Bart, and thus undermines the friendship which Lily had hoped would socially rehabilitate her. Only two friends remain for Lily: Gerty Farish (a cousin of Lawrence Selden) and Carry Fisher, who help her cope with the social ignominy of a degraded social status while continually advising Lily to marry as soon as reasonably possible.

Despite the efforts and advice of Gerty and Carry to help her overcome notoriety, Lily descends through the social strata of New York City's high society. She obtains a job as personal secretary of Mrs. Hatch, a disreputable woman who very nearly succeeds in marrying a wealthy young man in Lily's former social circle. It is during this occupation she is introduced to the use of chloral hydrate, sold in drugstores, as a remedy for malaise.  She resigns her position after Lawrence Selden returns to warn her of the danger, but not in time to avoid being blamed for the crisis. Lily then finds a job in a milliner's shop; yet, unaccustomed to the rigors of working class manual labor, her rate of production is low and the quality of her workmanship is poor, exacerbated by her increased use of the drug. She is fired at the end of the New York social season, when the demand for fashionable hats has diminished.

Meanwhile, Simon Rosedale, the Jewish suitor who previously had proposed marriage to Lily when she was higher on the social scale, reappears in her life and tries to rescue her, but Lily is unwilling to meet his terms. Simon wants Lily to use the love letters that she bought from Selden's servant to expose the love affair between Lawrence Selden and Bertha Dorset. For the sake of Selden's reputation, Lily does not act upon Rosedale's request and secretly burns the love letters when she visits Selden one last time.

Lily is stopped on the street by Nettie Struther, who Lily once helped get to a hospital. Nettie is now married and has a baby girl, and she invites Lily to her apartment to meet and feed the baby with her. Lily goes to Nettie's and they play with the baby.

Eventually, Lily Bart receives a ten-thousand-dollar inheritance from her Aunt Peniston, which she arranges to use to repay Gus Trenor. Distraught by her misfortunes, Lily has by this time begun regularly using a sleeping draught of chloral hydrate to escape the pain of poverty and social ostracism. Once she has repaid all her debts, Lily takes an overdose of the sleeping draught and dies; perhaps it is suicide, perhaps an accident.  As she is dying, she hallucinates cradling Nettie's baby in her arms. That very morning, Lawrence Selden arrives to her quarters, to finally propose marriage, but finds Lily Bart dead.  Among her belongings are receipts for her payments toward the debt she owed to Gus Trenor, proving that her financial dealings with Trenor were honorable and not evidence of an improper relationship.  His realization allows him to feel sympathy and closeness for her, and he is clearly distraught at her death.

Characters
Lily Bart—Wharton paints Lily, the heroine of her novel, as a complex personality with the purity that her Christian name implies, the defiance that her surname implies, and the foolishness that the title of the novel implies. The combination of the social pressures and conventions of her reference group and her refusal to "settle" numerous times to save herself portend a fateful destiny where she becomes complicit in her own destruction.  Wharton depicts Lily as having an aesthetic purpose in life—a fine specimen to be looked at and admired. Her extraordinary beauty should have served her well to find a wealthy husband with the requisite social status that would have secured her place in upper-class New York society. However, her inner longing to become free of her society's social conventions, her sense of what is right, and her desire for love as well as money and status have thwarted her success in spite of a number of eligible admirers over the ten years she has been on the marriage market.  Challenges to her success are her advancing age—she is 29 as the novel begins—the loss of her father's wealth, and the death of her parents which has left her orphaned without a caring protector, her constant efforts to "keep up with the Joneses"(4), the very modest but erratic "allowance" from her strait-laced Aunt Julia, and her gambling debts which make her the subject of vile gossip.  To protect Lawrence Selden's reputation, she refuses to use damning evidence against her nemesis, Bertha Dorset, which would have recouped her ruined social standing. This leads to a tragic yet heroic ending.

Lawrence Selden—A young lawyer who, although not wealthy himself, is able to move easily within and without Old New York's elite social circles through kinship with old-line New York families. He has known Lily since her "coming out" eleven years earlier. For all this time he has been in the background of her life. He views the comings and goings of New York's high society with the detachment and the objectivity of an outsider —a characteristic that Lily not only admires but also that allows her to view those people in her surroundings in an objective, critical and a not-so-flattering way. She becomes fascinated and envies his independence from the "tribe" and the freedom that has given him. Her encounters with Selden underscore the conflict between her inner voice —her self-hood at its core— and the outer voices of her reference group. It is from Selden's description, assessment and admiration of Lily's outward characteristics that we glean those attributes that contribute to New York high society's perception and misperceptions of who she is. He can be brutally honest about Lily's superficiality and artificiality and simultaneously appreciate the sparks of freedom and spontaneity that temper these negatives. These mutual admirable qualities give way to their romantic regard for one another. He is not, however, free from the social pressure of rumor. Though he has shown Lily consistent friendship, he abandons her when she becomes the victim of appearances that put her virtue, as an unmarried woman, in question.

Simon Rosedale—A successful and socially astute Jewish businessman—the quintessential parvenu—who has the money but not the social standing to be accepted into the circle of New York's leisure class. Building his fortune in real estate, Rosedale makes his first appearance in the story when he observes Lily leaving his apartment building after what appears to be a tryst with one of his tenants.  Rosedale is interested in Lily because not only is she beautiful, but what is more important, she is also a social asset in gaining him a place in high society. She reflects that she has put herself in his power by her clumsy dress-maker fib and her refusal to allow him to take her to the station which would have given him the prestige of being seen by members of the society with whom he was aspiring to gain acceptance.  As his social ascendency continues, he offers Lily marriage which would provide her a way out of her financial dilemma and her precarious social standing; she puts him off. His cleverness and business acumen serve him well to achieve a higher and higher rung on the social ladder. Lily, however, is on her way down to the point that Rosedale is no longer interested in marrying her. Despite the differences in their social standing , Rosedale by the end of the story shows compassion for Lily. He offers her a loan when he runs into her after she has lost her hat-making job—an offer she refuses.

Percy Gryce—A conservative, rich, but shy and unimaginative young eligible bachelor on whom Lily, with the support of her friend Judy Trenor, sets her sights. Percy's less than titillating personality notwithstanding, Lily works out a strategy to catch him at week-long festivities at Bellomont.  Her fortuitous and successful encounter with Percy on the train to Bellomont further encourages her in pursuit of her goal. Her strategy gets interrupted, however, when Selden at week's end also appears on the scene unexpectedly. Lily then decides, on the spur of the moment, to set aside her well-thought-out tactics to pursue Percy in favor of spending some time with Selden. When, at a more rational moment, she returns to pursuing Percy, his mother-in law-to-be tells Lily at Jack Stepny's and Gwen Van Osburgh's wedding about his engagement to Evie Van Osburgh.

Bertha Dorset (Mrs. George Dorset)—A petite and pretty high-society matron whose husband George is extremely wealthy. She is first introduced catching the train to Bellomont where she boards with great fanfare and commotion. She demands that the porter find her a seat with her friends, Lily and Percy. Once at Bellomont Judy Trenor intimates to Lilly that Bertha is manipulative and also unscrupulous such that it is better to have her as a friend rather than an enemy. It is well known that Bertha is bored with her husband and seeks attention and love outside the confines of marriage. At Bellomont Bertha continues to pursue Selden in an attempt to rekindle the flame of an adulterous affair they have been carrying on but with which he has become disenamored. As Book I ends, she invites Lily to accompany her on a Mediterranean cruise to distract her husband so she can carry on an affair with Ned Silverton. Bertha understands, as a married woman, she must keep up appearances and ruthlessly impugns Lily's reputation to mask her own adultery. She spreads false rumors that besmirch Lily's virtue among their friends. Lily, as an unmarried woman without a protector, has little she can do in her own defense.

Mrs. Peniston (Julia)—Lily's wealthy, widowed Aunt –sister to Lily's father.  Mrs. Peniston embodies "old school" morality and has a family pedigree that goes back to the industrious and successful Dutch families of early New York. Although she maintains an opulent residence on fashionable Fifth Avenue, she does not follow fashion or renovate constantly to maintain a chic appearance. In Lily's eyes, the Peniston home is therefore dingy. Mrs. Peniston's "Old New York" lifestyle requires keeping her drawing room neat, eating well and dressing expensively. She harbors a passive attitude and does not actively engage in life. Although she spends time in the country during the first part of the book, by the last half of the book she is a shut-in with significant heart problems. When Lily arrived in New York in financial distress after the death of her mother, Mrs. Peniston took pleasure in the public display of her generosity by agreeing to take Lily on for a year after her mother died—much to the relief of the extended family. She found, to her surprise, that she liked the volatile Lily. She therefore continued to support Lily for over a decade during Lily's fruitless search for a wealthy, socially connected husband. She indulges and passively enables Lily's habit of gallivanting with her fashionable friends, and ignores the way Lily avoids and abandons her. Although Lily is clearly Julia's favorite, displacing her previous favorite Grace Stepney, Julia never makes any verbal or written promise to provide for Lily in the long term. Although Lily and her friends believe that is "understood" that she will inherit most if not all of Julia's fortune, Julia herself never made such a statement. Indeed, her forbearance is stretched to the limit when rumors reach her that Lily gambles for money and is encouraging attention from married men who compensate her for it. As upset as Julia is by evidence of Lily's immoral behavior, she does not immediately ask Lily for details because it is easier to discredit the messenger. When Lily comes to Julia asking for money to pay various debts, including what Lily passes off as gambling debts, Julia refuses. The relationship is permanently damaged, and when Lily sails away with the Dorsets instead of cleaning up the social and financial mess she has made, Julia does not write to Lily or attempt to repair the relationship. When word reaches her that Lily has been publicly accused of having an affair with George Dorset, and when Lily continues to gallivant in Europe instead of returning home, Julia disinherits Lily in favor of the more loyal Grace Stepney. By the time Lily returns to New York, Julia has died, and nobody knows about the disinheritance until her will is read.

Judy Trenor (Mrs. Gus Trenor)—Lily's best friend and confidante— is the stereotypical high-society matron, married to Gus Trenor, a successful business man. She frequently hosts large parties and social events at their country home, Bellomont. By engaging in gossip Mrs. Trenor keeps up on the social scene. She acts as matchmaker between Lily and Percy Gryce. She uses Lily as her surrogate private secretary and spends much of her day making sure that every detail of her events is done to perfection. This includes poring over lists to decide which guests are the most desirable to invite, which have been "stolen" by another conflicting event, and which unmarried men and women should be set up together. She invites Selden to Bellomont on anonymous advice to keep Mrs. George Dorset entertained. Judy suffers from frequent headaches and avoids noisy environments such as the opera. She must sometimes cancel minor engagements on short notice, and prefers to stay at Bellomont when her head hurts.

Gus Trenor—Judy Trenor's husband—a massive man with a heavy carnivorous head and a very red complexion. He is a successful stock market speculator and an advocate of Simon Rosedale's acceptance in high society circles although he considers him a bounder. He is also a notorious flirt and looks for attention in relationships with women outside of his marriage. Gus becomes enamored with Lily, a frequent guest at his wife's weekend social events. He uses his financial investment skills and a large sum of his own money in a risky investment for Lily which she agrees to. The proceeds from this speculation will help her pay her gambling debts and other expenses necessary to keep up appearances. The investment pays off for Lily financially, as Gus intends that it should, but the friendship turns sour when Lily is unwilling to exchange romantic attention for money the way Gus believes she tacitly agrees to do.

Carry Fisher (Mrs. Fisher)—A small, fiery and dramatic divorcée. She is perceived as carrying "a general air of embodying a 'spicy paragraph';"(70) and according to Mrs. Trenor, ". . .most of her alimony is paid by other people's husbands." (91) She sponges money from Gus Trenor to cover her bills much to his wife's chagrin. Although Gus accepts romantic favors from Mrs. Fisher in exchange for paying her bills and investing her money in the stock market, he considers her a "battered wire-puller"(94) in comparison to the fresh and unsullied Miss Bart. Carry is also known for bringing newcomers into high society such as Rosedale and the Wellington Brys, who had managed the miracle of making money in a falling market. After Lily has been expelled from the upper class by Bertha, Carry is one of the few people who still show compassion toward her, offering Lily support and job opportunities. Carry is an example of a woman who finds ways to earn money and to succeed in society despite being divorced and somewhat disreputable. Her presence in the story refutes the notion that Lily has no choice except to self-destruct.

Ned Silverton—A young man, whose first intention was to live on proofreading and write an epic, but ended up living off his friends. Ned's romantic relationship at the Bellomont house party is with Carry Fisher. Six months later, Ned accompanies Lily and the Dorsets on their Mediterranean cruise. He has an affair with Mrs Dorset, who manages to keep it concealed from most of society. Ned's increasing gambling addiction consumes not only his resources but that of his sisters, who live in poverty while he travels with Bertha Dorset. After the fling with Bertha ends, Ned participates in a scheme to help a purportedly wealthy but disreputable woman to marry the younger brother of Gwen and Evie Van Osburgh. This conspiracy, in which Lily is implicated, helps ensure Lily's downfall.

Evie Van Osburgh—A young, innocent, dull, and conservative, stay-at-home kind of a girl, heiress to a substantial fortune.  Judy Trenor paired her sister, Gwen, with Percy Gryce at the Sunday-night supper at Bellomont. Evie ends up getting engaged within six weeks of their stay at Bellomont to Percy Gryce due to Bertha Dorset's match-making skills.

Gerty Farish—Selden's cousin. She is a kind, generous woman who occupies herself with charity work, but Lily despises her because of her less than glamorous appearance. In Book Two, Gerty becomes one of Lily's only friends, giving her a place to stay and taking care of her when everyone else abandons her. Lily does not wish to continue living with Gerty or combining resources because she is unwilling to lower herself to the standard of living Gerty can afford.

Jack Stepney and Gwen (Van Osburgh) Stepney—A very wealthy couple—guests at Bellomont just before celebrating their wedding at the Van Osburgh's estate six weeks later. They belong to Old New York's high society, although their money comes from Gwen's side. Prior to his marriage, the nearly bankrupt Jack has business dealings with Simon Rosedale and has tried to afford him entrée into New York's high society. After marrying Gwen, Jack becomes plump, conservative, and complacent. Jack is Lily's cousin so he agrees to shelter her for the night after Bertha kicks her off her yacht for ostensibly carrying on romantically with Bertha's husband.

Grace Stepney—Lily's middle-aged cousin lives in a boarding house and has spent most of her life waiting on Julia Peniston. Until Lily arrived, Grace was Julia's favorite: she shares Julia's conservatism and sense of propriety, and she is willing to help out during the fall cleaning. Grace attracts and remembers all manner of gossip related to high society in general and to Lily in particular, but does not generally gossip herself. Lily treats Grace very poorly, regarding her as insignificant. When Lily prevails on her aunt Julia to exclude Grace from a family dinner party, Grace retaliates. She relays to Aunt Julia the talk about Lily's attention to Gus Trenor in exchange for money that Lily used to pay gambling debts, and stops protecting Lily from the otherwise predictable consequences of Lily's actions. When Lily comes to Grace after the reading of the will, Grace does not have the money to give Lily the loan she is asking for because the assets Grace inherited from Julia are still tied up in probate. When Lily asks Grace to borrow money against Aunt Julia's estate and lend or give it to Lily, Grace refuses.

Critical reception
In the contemporary book review "New York Society Held up to Scorn in three New Books" (15 October 1905) The New York Times critic said that  The House of Mirth is "a novel of remarkable power" and that "its varied elements are harmoniously blended, and [that] the discriminating reader who has completed the whole story in a protracted sitting, or two, must rise from it with the conviction that there are no parts of it which do not properly and essentially belong to the whole. Its descriptive passages have verity and charm, it has the saving grace of humor, its multitude of personages, as we have said, all have the semblance of life."

The publication of the novel prompted letters to the editor of the "New York Times Saturday Review of Books" which argued the merits of the story, saying that the novel was a faithful and true portrait of the New York City gentry, while detractors said that it impugned the character of the city's social élite as a heartless and materialist leisure class.

Adaptations 
The novel The House of Mirth (1905) has been adapted to radio, the stage and the cinema.

 The Play of the novel The House of Mirth (1906), by Edith Wharton and Clyde Fitch.
 La Maison du Brouillard (1918), directed by Albert Capellani, featured Katherine Harris Barrymore as Lily Bart; a French silent film.
 The House of Mirth was presented on radio's Theatre Guild on the Air December 14, 1952. The one-hour adaptation starred Joan Fontaine and Franchot Tone.
 The House of Mirth (1956), directed by John Drew Barrymore. Matinee Theatre: Season 2, Episode 56. (4 December 1956)
 The House of Mirth (1981), directed by Adrian Hall. A television film for the Public Broadcasting System in the U.S.
Edith Wharton's The House of Mirth (1995) adapted for the stage by Dawn Keeler. The play was performed by the Cambridge Theatre Company at the Theatre Royal in Winchester, England. After the initial production, the play toured England for nine weeks. This modern adaptation offers a late-twentieth-century interpretation of Lily Bart's story that emphasizes freedom, relationships, and tragedy.
 The House of Mirth (2000), directed by Terence Davies, featured Gillian Anderson as Lily Bart.
 Composer Garth Baxter has written the opera Lily based upon The House of Mirth, with a libretto by Lisa VanAuken. Lily is a two-act opera in the romantic tradition with full orchestra. Arias from the opera have been featured in two albums: Katherine Keem Sings Songs and Arias by Garth Baxter, from Centaur Records, and ASK THE MOON, music for voice and piano by Garth Baxter from Navona Records.

Notes

References

Sources
 Auchincloss, Louis (1961). Edith Wharton and her New Yorks, Reflections of a Jacobite. Boston: Houghton Mifflin.
 Barnett, Louise K.(1989). Language, gender and society in The House of Mirth. Connecticut Review 11.2 (Summer), 54-63.
 Commander, Katherine Lucille (2008). "Tragedy in The House of Mirth: The decline of Lily Bart" University of Tennessee Honors Thesis Projects.http://trace.tennessee.edu/utk_chanhonoproj/1165 
 

  in 
  in 
 Rattray, L.(ed.).(2012). Edith Wharton in Context. New York: Cambridge University Press. 400pp.
 Showalter, Elaine, The death of the lady (novelist): Wharton's House of Mirth in Carol J. Singley, ed. (2003). Edith Wharton's The House of Mirth, A Case Book, pp. 39–61. New York: Oxford University Press. p. 337. .

 Singley, Carol J., Introduction in Carol J. Singley, ed. (2003). Edith Wharton's The House of Mirth, A Case Book,pp. 3–24. New York: Oxford University Press. p. 337. .
  in 
  in 
  in 
 Wolff, Cynthia Griffin, Lily Bart and the drama of femininity in Carol J. Singley, ed. (2003). Edith Wharton's The House of Mirth, A Case Book,pp. 209–228. New York: Oxford University Press. p. 337. .

Reviews

 Kornasky, L. (2014). "Edith Wharton in context". Studies in American Naturalism, 9(1), 107.
 Preston, C. (2004). "The critical reception of Edith Wharton". The Yearbook of English Studies, 34(1) Nineteenth-Century Travel Writing,336-338.Accessed: 01-04-2016 03:52 UTC.DOI: 10.2307/3509561 
 Singley, C., & Moseley, A. (2007). "Wharton and Cather". American Literary Scholarship, 2007(1), 139-168.
 Wharton, Edith. (1905). "Mr. Sturgis's Belchamber", Bookman, 21(May), 309-310.

External links

 
 
 

1905 American novels
Novels by Edith Wharton
American novels adapted into films
American novels adapted into plays
Novels set in New York City
American novels adapted into television shows
Works originally published in Scribner's Magazine
Novels first published in serial form
Novels set in the 19th century